Georg Julius Leopold Engel  (born 22 October 1866  in Greifswald; died  19 October 1931  in Berlin), also known as Johannes Jörgensen, was a German writer, dramatist and literary critic. His novels appeared in large print runs.

Life 
Engel spent his youth in Breslau. After studying philosophy and history in Berlin from 1887 to 1890, he worked as an art and theatre critic for the Berliner Tageblatt newspaper and from 1891 he was active as a writer in Berlin.

In his novel Hann Klüth, der Philosoph (1905) and in his collection of novellas Die Leute von Moorluke (1910), set in Greifswald and surrounds, he portrayed lively and life-affirming north German characters. He wrote many dramas, but they are   no longer performed. Engel was the President of the Imperial Union of German Literatur (Reichsverband des deutschen Schrifttums). This organisation provided social security for independent authors. He acquired recognition and awards of merit for this.

During the National Socialist period, his work was considered undesirable as Engel was non-Aryan by the state's definition. The commemorative plaque was removed from the house in Greifswald where he was born, his gravestone in Elisenhain (a forest in Greifswald) was knocked over. Some of Engel's books were banned, removed from libraries and burnt. His grave was fixed after 1945.

Works

Fiction 

 "Ahnen und Enkel", 1892
 "Das Nächsten Weib", 1893
 "Blind und andere Novellen", 1894
 Zauberin Circe, 1894
 Die Last, 1898
 Die Furcht vor dem Weibe, 1899
 Hann Klüth, der Philosoph, 1905 (translated into English as "The Philosopher and the Foundling" (1932))
 Der verbotene Rausch, 1909
 Der Reiter auf dem Regenbogen, 1909
 Die Leute von Moorluke, 1910
 Die verirrte Magd, 1911
 Die vier Könige, 1913
 Der Fahnenträger, 1914
 Die Herrin und ihr Knecht, 1917
 Kathrin, 1918
 Claus Störtebeker, 1920
 Die Prinzessin und der Heilige, 1922
 Die Mauer, 1923
 Erlebtes und Erträumtes, 1923
 Die Mauer, 1923
 Die Liebe durch die Luft, 1925
 Uhlenspiegel, 1927
 Des Äthers und der Liebe Wellen, 1929
 Das Gericht, 1931

Drama 

 Der Hexenkessel, 1894
 Hadasa, 1895
 Sturmglocken, 1899
 Der Ausflug in's Sittliche, 1900
 Über den Wassern, 1902
 Jim Hafen, 1906
 Die Hochzeit von Poël, 1906
 Das lachende Mirakel, 1906
 Die heitere Residenz, 1913
 Die Unsichtbaren, 1920
 Die Diplomaten, 1925

Films based on his works 

 The Fear of Women (1921) based on Die Furcht vor dem Weibe
 The Mistress and her Servant (1929) based on Die Herrin und ihr Knecht

Bibliography 

 Lutz Mohr: Greifswald-Eldena und das Kloster Hilda. Ein Streifzug und Wegweiser durch die Greifswalder Ortsteile Eldena und Friedrichshagen in Vergangenheit und Gegenwart. Neue Greifswalder Museumshefte, Heft 1/1977, 2. erw. Aufl. Greifswald 1979 
 Lutz Mohr: "Ein verfemter Grab- und Gedenkstein in Greifswald (Mecklenburg-Vorpommern)". In: Steinkreuzforschung (SKF). Studien zur deutschen und internationalen Flurdenkmalforschung. ed. by Rainer H. Schmeissner. Reihe B (Sammelbände), Sammelband Nr. 25 (NF 10), Regensburg 1998, p. 83-

References

External links 
 
 Georg Engel at Project Gutenberg Germany
 
 
 
 
 

1866 births
1931 deaths
German literary critics
German male non-fiction writers
People from Greifswald